Triumph of the Revolution also known as Liberation Day is a celebration in Cuba of the anniversary of the victory of the revolution led by Fidel Castro in 1959 which established the present government in Cuba. The previous president, Fulgencio Batista fled the country on 31 December 1958. The holiday is celebrated on January 1 every year.

The event is marked by military parades, fireworks and concerts throughout the country. The first parade of the Cuban Revolutionary Armed Forces on the holiday took place on the Plaza de la Revolución in 1960.

Several exiled Cuban communities such as in Miami where many Cuban Americans reside celebrate May 20 as their national holiday in which Cuba became independent from the United States as opposed to the January 1 holiday. U.S. President Donald Trump released a statement in 2017 only to be met with resistance from the Cuban government labeling it "controversial" and "ridiculous".

See also
 Public holidays in Cuba
 Cuban Revolution

References

Society of Cuba
Remembrance days
January observances